Eintracht Wetzlar is a German association football club based in Wetzlar, Hesse.

History
Formed on 30 July 1905 as Wetzlarer Fußball Club, they merged with Wetzlarer Ballspielclub 1910 in 1927 to become Sportverein Wetzlar 05. From the early 30s until the early 40s, the team played second division football until a title win advanced them to the Gauliga Hessen-Nassau (I) for a single season.

Following World War II a number of local sides including SV were combined to create Sportgemeinde Eintracht Wetzlar which, for all but five seasons, played third division football as a lower table side until the formation of the Bundesliga – Germany's first top-flight professional league – in 1963. SG carried on as a third-tier club in the Oberliga Hessen until an 18th-place result in 1971 saw the side relegated. After thirty-six years in lower-tier competition, Eintracht returned to the Oberliga Hessen (IV) in 2007 after capturing the second place in the Landesliga Hessen-Mitte (V), but this lasted only for one season, the club being relegated again.

The club made another return to the Hessenliga in 2010 but lasted for only two seasons before suffering another relegation.

Honours
The club's honours:

League
 Verbandsliga Hessen-Mitte 
 Champions: 2010
 Runners-up: 2003, 2007

Cup
 Hesse Cup 
 Winners: 1947, 1957

Recent managers
Recent managers of the club:

Recent seasons
The recent season-by-season performance of the club:

 With the introduction of the Regionalligas in 1994 and the 3. Liga in 2008 as the new third tier, below the 2. Bundesliga, all leagues below dropped one tier. Also in 2008, a large number of football leagues in Hesse were renamed, with the Oberliga Hessen becoming the Hessenliga, the Landesliga becoming the Verbandsliga, the Bezirksoberliga becoming the Gruppenliga and the Bezirksliga becoming the Kreisoberliga.

References

Sources
 Grüne, Hardy (2001). Vereinslexikon. Kassel: AGON Sportverlag

External links
 Official website 
 Eintracht Wetzlar at Weltfussball.de 
 Das deutsche Fußball-Archiv  historical German domestic league tables

Football clubs in Germany
Football clubs in Hesse
Sport in Wetzlar
Association football clubs established in 1905
1905 establishments in Germany